The 2020–21 VMI Keydets basketball team represented the Virginia Military Institute during the 2020–21 NCAA Division I men's basketball season. The Keydets were led by sixth-year head coach Dan Earl and played their home games in Cameron Hall in Lexington, Virginia, their home since 1981, as members of the Southern Conference.

Previous season 
The Keydets finished the 2019–20 campaign with a record of 9–24, 3–15 in SoCon play to finish in ninth place. They defeated Samford in the first round of the SoCon tournament before losing to East Tennessee State in the quarterfinals.

Roster

Schedule and results

|-
!colspan=9 style=|Non-conference regular season

|-
!colspan=9 style=|SoCon regular season

|-
!colspan=9 style=| SoCon tournament
|-

|-

Source

References 

VMI Keydets basketball seasons
VMI
VMI Keydets bask
VMI Keydets bask